The Arbor Day Foundation is an American 501(c)(3) nonprofit membership organization dedicated to planting trees. The Arbor Day Foundation has more than one million members and has planted more than 350 million trees in neighborhoods, communities, cities and forests throughout the world. The Foundation's stated mission is "to inspire people to plant, nurture, and celebrate trees." The organization has a Charity Navigator rating of 3 out of 4 stars and is based in Nebraska.

History 

The Arbor Day Foundation was founded in 1969, the centennial of the first Arbor Day observance.

Programs 
Through the global reforestation program, the Arbor Day Foundation and international partners have replanted more than 108 million trees lost to fire, insects, disease, and weather in forests in the United States and around the world. These rejuvenated forests help to protect watersheds, stabilize soil, restore wildlife habitats, improve air quality and create jobs.

Tree City USA 
Founded in 1976 and co-sponsored by the National Association of State Foresters and the United States Forest Service, the Tree City USA program provides a framework for communities to manage and expand their public trees. More than 3,900 communities have achieved Tree City USA status by meeting four core standards of sound urban forestry management: maintaining a tree board or department, having a community tree ordinance, spending at least $2 per capita on urban forestry and celebrating Arbor Day. Today, in all fifty states, Washington, D.C., and Puerto Rico nearly 155 million Americans are living in Tree City USA towns and cities.

Time for Trees 
In 2018, the Arbor Day Foundation launched the Time for Trees initiative to plant 100 million trees in forests and communities around the world and engage 5 million tree planters by the 50th Anniversary of the Foundation in 2022.

Team Trees 
In 2019, Team Trees was formed when YouTube creators, MrBeast and Mark Rober joined with the Arbor Day Foundation to raise $20 million to plant 20 million trees. The campaign crowdfunded $20 million in 56 days. More than 800,000 people donated from 200 countries and territories. The campaign set the record for the biggest YouTube collaboration and fundraiser in history notable donors such as Elon Musk and Tobias Lütke, who each donated over a million dollars. The goal to reach 20,000,000 trees was reached on December 19, 2019. and as of September 2021 #TeamTrees has raised $23 million

Tree resources 
Arborday.org has a comprehensive set of guides and extensive information about tree species, selection, planting, and care, including a zip code look-up tool to find your hardiness zone. 
ARBOR DAY FARM
This natural educational center in Nebraska City, Nebraska, is the birthplace of Arbor Day, with 260 acres of land and outdoor exploration. Arbor Day Farm is home to Lied Lodge & Conference Center, an environmentally sustainable hotel with 136 guest rooms and a full-service meeting center dedicated to supporting tree planting, conservation, and stewardship around the globe. Tree Adventure, an award-winning nature-themed attraction, and Arbor Lodge State Historical Park are also part of Arbor Day Farm.

See also

Britain in Bloom
Entente Florale
List of Tree Cities USA
Reforestation

References

External links
 

Environmental organizations based in the United States
Environmental education
Urban forestry organizations
Charities based in Nebraska
Non-profit organizations based in Nebraska
1972 establishments in Nebraska
Environmental organizations established in 1972